Hadar Ratzon-Rotem is an Israeli actress.

Early life 
Hadar Ratzon was born in Jerusalem, Israel, to a family of Mizrahi Jewish (Yemenite-Jewish) descent. She grew up in Hod HaSharon, Israel. Ratzon graduated from Yoram Levinstein Acting Studio at the age of 28.<ref>{{Cite news|last=Izikovich|first=Gili|date=October 19, 2012|title=Prisoners of War' Is the Most Amazing Thing That Has Ever Happened to Me'|work=Haaretz|url=https://www.haaretz.com/.premium-prisoner-break-1.5193689|url-access=subscription|access-date=June 30, 2021|archive-date=August 18, 2020|archive-url=https://web.archive.org/web/20200818050659/https://www.haaretz.com/.premium-prisoner-break-1.5193689|url-status=live}}</ref>

 Filmography 
She played Nadia, the wife of Eli Cohen, in the television series The Spy. In Homeland'', she played the Mossad agent Tova.

References

External links 

 

Living people
21st-century Israeli actresses
Israeli people of Yemeni-Jewish descent
Israeli Mizrahi Jews
1978 births